The 1922 Tamworth by-election was held on 17 January 1922.  The by-election was held due to the death of the incumbent Coalition Conservative MP, Henry Wilson-Fox.  It was won by the Coalition Conservative candidate Percy Newson.

Result

References

1922 in England
1922 elections in the United Kingdom
By-elections to the Parliament of the United Kingdom in Staffordshire constituencies
20th century in Staffordshire
Politics of Tamworth, Staffordshire